Cerasibacillus  is a moderately thermophilic, alkaliphilic, strictly aerobic, rod-shaped, spore-forming and motile genus of bacteria from the family of Bacillaceae with one known species (Cerasibacillus quisquiliarum).

References

Bacillaceae
Bacteria genera
Monotypic bacteria genera